() is a town in Zhongshan, Guangdong, China.

References

Zhongshan
Towns in Guangdong